Malsheykh (also Romanized as Mālsheykh) is a village in Tayebi-ye Garmsiri-ye Shomali Rural District, in the Central District of Landeh County, Kohgiluyeh and Boyer-Ahmad Province, Iran. According to the 2006 census, Malsheykh's population was 652, spanning across 117 families.

References 

Populated places in Landeh County